"Nice Guy Eddie" is a song by English Britpop band Sleeper, written by the band's vocalist and guitarist Louise Wener. It was the third single to be released from their second album, The It Girl. It peaked at number 10 on the UK Singles Chart.

While the tracks from The It Girl were being demoed, several tracks had working titles based on characters from Reservoir Dogs: Nice Guy Eddie is the only one that kept that name.  A segment of the song was used by BBC Wales for the intro and outro music for their coverage of the FAW Invitational Cup in the late 1990s and early 2000s.

Track listings
UK CD single Indolent SLEEP 013CD
EU CD single BMG 74321 40149-2

"Nice Guy Eddie" – 3:23
"Pokerface" – 3:30
"Blazer Sleeves" – 2:50

UK 7" single Indolent SLEEP 013
UK cassette single Indolent SLEEP 013MC

"Nice Guy Eddie" – 3:23
"Inbetweener (live)" – 3:55
"Inbetweener" (featuring Mark and Lard)

Comprehensive charts

References

External links
 "Nice Guy Eddie" music video
 Sleeper @ BBC Music
 Sleeper release discography @ We Heart Music

1996 singles
1996 songs
Sleeper (band) songs
Song recordings produced by Stephen Street
Songs written by Louise Wener